Waterford Precision Cycles is a small bicycle manufacturer based in Waterford, Wisconsin. Waterford produces high-end, custom, hand-built, steel-alloy frame bicycles, particularly road, criterium, stage, track, and cyclocross racing bicycles, that range in price from about $2,500 to $8,500. Waterford builds both TIG welded and lugged steel frames to order, and specializes in custom and unique bicycle frames.

The company is operated by Richard Schwinn, formerly of Schwinn Bicycle Company, and business partner Marc Muller. Schwinn (great-grandson of Ignaz Schwinn, who founded Schwinn Co. in 1896) was vice president of production for Schwinn Co., and Muller worked for Schwinn as a designer of the company's hand-crafted Paramount racing bikes.

Gunnar
The company also manufactures Gunnar Cycles, which are steel-alloy, TIG welded bicycle frames and forks including off-road, touring, racing and recreational bicycles, that start at roughly $1500 for a frame and fork combination. Unlike a custom Waterford frame, they did not offer custom sizing which helped keep the price lower.

Others
In addition, Waterford manufactures frames for Rivendell Bicycle Works, the Milwaukee Bicycle Co. and Shinola Detroit as well as several other small specialty bicycle companies.

External links
 Waterford official site
 Gunnar official site

Cycle manufacturers of the United States
Companies based in Wisconsin
Mountain bike manufacturers
Bicycle framebuilders